Navrachana Vidyani Vidyalaya is a primary, secondary and higher secondary school under the Navrachana Education Society in Vadodara, Gujarat, India. It is affiliated to the Gujarat Board.

References

External links
Navrachna Vidyani

Schools in Vadodara